You're Telling Me may refer to:

 You're Telling Me!, a 1934 American pre-Code comedy film
 You're Telling Me (film), a 1942 American comedy film